Gergő Kovács (born 30 October 1989 in Ajka) is a Hungarian footballer, who plays as a centre back.

External links 
 
 HLSZ 

1989 births
Living people
People from Ajka
Hungarian footballers
Association football defenders
Zalaegerszegi TE players
FC Ajka players
Soproni VSE players
Nemzeti Bajnokság I players
Sportspeople from Veszprém County